Wangtang (旺塘, 汪塘, 网塘) is a name of numerous villages in China. Only a few of them are listed below:

 Wangtang is the name of 3 towns in Anhui prefecture.
One is located at 
 Wangtang, Guangdong in Jianggu, Sihui, Zhaoqing, Guangdong
 Wangtang (northwest of Guilin), Guangxi
 Wangtang, Guilin, Guangxi in Chaotian, Lingchuan, Guilin, Guangxi
 Wangtang, Hunan

See also 

 Wangtan (disambiguation)

References